Gongzi You (公子友), (died 796 BC), also known as Cao You (曹友), also known as Yan You (颜友), Cao surname, Yan clan, name: You (友), other name: Fei (肥), he was the founding monarch of Xiao Zhu, a vassal state of Western Zhou. His father was Duke Wu of Zhu, the 7th generation monarch of Zhu.

History 

Cao Yifu earned merits and was appointed ruler to the Ni (state), also known as Xiao Zhu. Zhu was then divided into three kingdoms.

References 

Zhou dynasty people
796 BC deaths

Year of birth unknown